is a railway station in the city of Shibata, Niigata, Japan, operated by East Japan Railway Company (JR East).

Lines
Sasaki Station is served by the Hakushin Line, and is 21.0 kilometers from the starting point of the line at Niigata Station.

Station layout
The station consists of one side platform and one  island platform connected to the station building by a footbridge.

Platforms

History
Sasaki Station opened on 23 December 1952. With the privatization of Japanese National Railways (JNR) on 1 April 1987, the station came under the control of JR East.

Passenger statistics
In fiscal 2017, the station was used by an average of 890 passengers daily (boarding passengers only).

Surrounding area

Sasaki Post Office

See also
 List of railway stations in Japan

References

External links
 JR East station information 

Railway stations in Niigata Prefecture
Hakushin Line
Railway stations in Japan opened in 1952
Stations of East Japan Railway Company
Shibata, Niigata